The 1912 Boston College football team was an American football team that represented Boston College as an independent during the 1912 college football season. Led by first-year head coach William Joy, Boston College compiled a record of 2–4–1.

Schedule

References

Boston College
Boston College Eagles football seasons
Boston College football